Bhestan is a town and locality in Surat city of Surat district in the Indian state of Gujarat.

Demographics
 India census, Bhestan had a population of 52,936: Males constitute 62.40% of the population and females 37.60%.

Transport

BRTS
Bhestan is well connected to Udhna Darwaja and Sachin GIDC by Surat BRTS.

Railway
Bhestan railway station is located on the Western Railway Mumbai – Vadodara Segment. It is 10 km from Surat, 138 km from Vadodara and 254 km from Mumbai.

References

Cities and towns in Surat district